Clube Atlético Votuporanguense, commonly referred to as Votuporanguense, is a professional association football club based in Votuporanga, São Paulo, Brazil. The team competes in Campeonato Paulista Série A3, the third tier of the São Paulo state football league.

History
The club was founded on December 11, 2009, and became a professional football club in 2010, competing, for the first time in a professional competition, in the 2010 Campeonato Paulista Segunda Divisão, eventually being eliminated in the Second Stage of the competition.

Stadium
Clube Atlético Votuporanguense play their home games at Estádio Municipal Plínio Marin. The stadium has a maximum capacity of 9,227.

Players

References

External links
 CA Votuporanguense (official website)
 Latest News Regarding Votuporanguense (in Portuguese)

Association football clubs established in 2009
Football clubs in São Paulo (state)
2009 establishments in Brazil